The Mad Gasser of Mattoon (also known as the "Anesthetic Prowler," the "Phantom Anesthetist," or simply the "Mad Gasser") was the name given to the person or people believed to be responsible for a series of apparent gas attacks that occurred in Mattoon, Illinois, during the mid-1940s. More than two dozen separate cases of gassings were reported to police over the span of two weeks, in addition to many more reported sightings of the suspected assailant. The gasser's supposed victims reported smelling strange odors in their homes which were soon followed by symptoms such as paralysis of the legs, coughing, nausea and vomiting. No one died or had serious medical consequences.

Police remained skeptical of the accounts throughout the entire incident. No physical evidence was ever found, and many reported gassings had simple explanations, such as spilled nail polish or odors emanating from animals or local factories. Victims made quick recoveries from their symptoms and suffered no long-term effects. Nevertheless, local newspapers ran alarmist articles about the reported attacks and treated the accounts as fact.

The attacks are widely considered to be a case of mass hysteria. However, others maintain that the Mad Gasser actually existed, or that the perceived attacks have another explanation, such as industrial pollution.

Appearance
Most contemporary descriptions of the Mad Gasser are based on the testimony of Mr. and Mrs. Bert Kearney of 1408 Marshall Avenue, the victims of the first Mattoon case to be reported by the media. They described the gasser as being a tall, thin man dressed in dark clothing and wearing a tight-fitting cap. Another report, made some weeks later, described the gasser as being a female dressed as a man. The Gasser had also been described as carrying a flit gun, an agricultural tool for spraying pesticide, which he purportedly used to expel the gas.

Reported attacks 
The first of the 1944 gasser incidents occurred at a house on Grant Ave., Mattoon, on August 31, 1944. Urban Raef was awakened during the early hours of the morning by a strange odor. He felt nauseated and weak, and suffered from a fit of vomiting. Suspecting that he was suffering from domestic gas poisoning, Raef's wife tried to check the kitchen stove to see if there was a problem with the pilot light, but found that she was partially paralyzed and unable to leave her bed.

Later that night (some contemporary accounts refer to the time as the morning of the following day), a similar incident was also reported by a young mother living close by. She was awakened by the sound of her daughter coughing but found herself unable to leave her bed.

The next day, September 1, there was a third reported incident. A Mrs. Kearney, of Marshall Avenue, Mattoon, reported smelling a strong, sweet odor around 11:00 pm. At first she dismissed the smell, believing it to be from flowers outside of the window, but the odor soon became stronger and she began to lose feeling in her legs. Mrs. Kearney panicked and her calls attracted her sister, Mrs. Ready, who was in the house at the time. Mrs. Ready also noticed the odor, and determined that it was coming from the direction of the bedroom window, which was open at the time. The police were contacted, but no evidence of a prowler was found. At around 12:30 am, Bert Kearney, Mrs. Kearney's husband (a local taxi driver who had been absent during the time of the attack), returned home to find an unidentified man hiding close to one of the house's windows. The man fled and Kearney was unable to catch him. Kearney's description of the prowler was of a tall man dressed in dark clothing, wearing a tight fitting cap. This description was reported in the local media, and became the common description of the gasser throughout the Mattoon incident. After the attack, Mrs. Kearney reported suffering from a burning sensation on her lips and throat, which were attributed to the effects of the gas.

Initially, it was suspected that robbery was the primary motive for the attack. At the time of the incidents, the Kearneys had a large sum of money in the house, and it was surmised that the prowler could have seen Mrs. Kearney and her sister counting it earlier that evening. Local newspapers incorrectly reported this incident as being the first gasser attack.

In the days following the Kearney attack, there were half a dozen similar attacks (See table), though none of the purported victims were able to provide a clear description of the prowler, and no clues were found at the scene of the attacks. The first specimen of physical evidence was found on the night of September 5, when Carl and Beulah Cordes of North 21st Street returned home around 10:00 pm. After spending a few minutes in the house they noticed a piece of white cloth, slightly larger than a man's handkerchief, sitting on their porch next to the screen door. Beulah Cordes picked up the cloth and smelled it. As soon as she inhaled, she became violently ill. She described the effect as being similar to an electric shock. Her face quickly began to swell, she experienced a burning sensation in her mouth and throat, and began to vomit. As with other victims, she also reported feeling weak and experiencing partial paralysis of her legs. Beulah Cordes later hypothesized that the cloth had been left on the porch in order to knock out the family dog, which usually slept there, so that the prowler could gain access to the house unnoticed.

In addition to the cloth, a skeleton key, described as looking "well used," was reportedly found on the sidewalk adjacent to the porch, along with a large, almost empty, tube of lipstick. The cloth was analyzed by the authorities, but they found no chemicals on it that could explain Beulah Cordes' reaction.

The same night a second incident was reported, this time in North 13th Street, at the home of Mrs. Leonard Burrell. She reported seeing a stranger break in through her bedroom window and then attempt to gas her.

Public concern over the alleged gassings quickly rose, the FBI became involved, and the local police issued a statement calling on residents to avoid lingering in residential areas, and warning that groups set up to patrol for the gasser should be disbanded for reasons of public safety. Chief of Police C.E. Cole also warned concerned citizens to exercise due restraint when carrying or discharging firearms.

During this period, there was also an increase in physical evidence of attacks being reported, ranging from footprints allegedly being discovered underneath windows to tears being found in window screens.

By September 12, local police had received so many false alarms (mostly from citizens believing that they smelled gas, or that they had seen a prowler) that they reduced the priority afforded to gasser reports and announced that the entire incident was likely the result of explainable occurrences exacerbated by public fears, and a sign of the anxiety felt by women while local men were on war service.

After the police announcement, gasser reports declined. The only incident of arguable note after that date was the case of Bertha Burch, who claimed she saw a gasser who was a woman dressed as a man.

(List incomplete)

Explanations
There are three primary theories about the Mattoon Mad Gasser incident: mass hysteria, industrial pollution, or an actual physical assailant. The events have also been written about by authors on the paranormal.

Mass hysteria
Almost two weeks after the Mattoon attacks began, the local Commissioner of Public Health, Thomas V. Wright, announced that there had undoubtedly been a number of gassing incidents, but that many instances were likely due to hysteria: residents hearing of alarming events, and then panicking when confronted by an out-of-place odor or a shadow at the window; Wright stated:

On September 12, local Chief of Police C. E. Cole took Wright's hypothesis a step further, announcing that there had likely been no gas attacks at all, and that the reported incidents had probably been triggered by chemicals carried on the wind from nearby industrial facilities and then exacerbated by public panic.

Wright and Cole's diagnosis was given further validity in 1945 when the Journal of Abnormal and Social Psychology published "The 'phantom anesthetist' of Mattoon: a field study of mass hysteria" by Donald M. Johnson, which documented the Mattoon incident as a case study in mass hysteria. In 1959, his opinion was seconded by psychologist James P. Chaplin, and went on to form the basis for several subsequent studies of the phenomena of mass hysteria.

Most of the physical symptoms recorded during the Botetourt and Mattoon incidents (including choking, swelling of mucus membranes, and weakness/temporary paralysis) have all been suggested symptoms of hysteria.
Some experts believe that the mass hysteria was fueled by the headline in the Mattoon Journal-Gazette, "Mrs. Kearney and Daughter First Victims," which assumed there would be more attacks.

Toxic waste or pollution
On September 12, Chief of Police Cole told a press conference that odors and symptoms reported may have been the result of pollutants or toxic waste released by nearby industrial plants, and speculated that carbon tetrachloride or trichloroethylene, both of which have a sweet odor and can induce symptoms similar to those reported by purported gasser victims, may have been the substance released.

In response to Cole's statement, Atlas-Imperial, the primary company implicated in this affair, released a statement of its own saying that their facility had only five gallons of carbon tetrachloride in stock, which was contained in firefighting equipment. Atlas-Imperial officials also denied that any quantities of trichloroethylene (an industrial solvent used by Atlas) could be responsible for sickness in the town, reasoning that it would have taken significant quantities of the chemical to sicken the townspeople, and that factory workers would have experienced similar symptoms long before anybody outside of the factory was affected.

At the time of the gassing, the Atlas plant had been certified as safe by the State Department of Health.

Actual assailant
After analyzing events, some researchers have concluded that at least some of the gasser incidents were the work of an actual attacker who carried out a series of gassings as reported by witnesses.

Other suggestions
Some writers on the paranormal have covered the events. Clark (1993) describes an illustration of the Gasser from Loren Coleman's Mysterious America: "[the artist] depicts him as a not-quite-human, possibly extraterrestrial, being".

Popular culture 

 Monster in My Pocket action figure
 The Mad Gasser is the subject of numerous podcasts, including a 2018 episode of Do Go On, a 2016 episode of the Futility Closet, a 2015 episode of The Dollop, and a 2009 episode of The Memory Palace.
 In the video game series Megami Tensei The Mad Gasser of Mattoon appears as a reoccurring recruitable character.
In the science-fiction novel The Body Snatchers by Jack Finney, the story of the Mad Gasser of Mattoon is briefly discussed as one of the characters hypothesizes that the widespread panic which is spreading among the local population about potential alien invaders is nothing but mass hysteria.
In the television series  Supernatural, Season 1 Episode 15, the Mad Gasser is made mention of as the Phantom Gasser.

See also
 Fortean phenomena
 Nocebo
 Placebo
 Spring-heeled Jack
 Pérák, the Spring Man of Prague
 London Monster

References

Further reading
 
 
Van Huss, William B. (2017) The Mad Gasser of Botetourt County

External links
"The Mad Gasser of Mattoon: how the press created an imaginary chemical weapons attack" from Skeptical Inquirer, 7/1/2002
Site with newspaper headlines and a list of victims and locations of incidents

1944 in Illinois
Coles County, Illinois
Crimes in Illinois
Forteana
Mass psychogenic illness in the United States
People whose existence is disputed